Cugnon is a village of Wallonia and a district of the municipality of Bertrix, located in the province of Luxembourg, Belgium.

It was a municipality in its own right before the merger of the municipalities in 1977. It was separated from Auby-sur-Semois on 30 July 1899 and in 1964 annexed the hamlet of Thibauroche, detached from Muno.

Etymology 
Cugnon comes from the following:

Chez (Latin casae “at home” = French chez) Congidunus (Celtic surname, cf. the Breton king Cogidunus cited by Tacitus in Agricola, or the Gallic Conconnetodunnus, cited by L. Roger; this name contains the Gallic duno “pregnant” and the Celtic adjective * connios “clever, end”).

Notable people
Hubert Pierlot was born in Cugnon

Notes

References

External links

Bertrix
Former municipalities of Luxembourg (Belgium)